Bullitt is the debut album by saxophonist Wilton Felder recorded in 1969 and released on the Pacific Jazz label.

Reception

AllMusic rated the album with 2 stars.

Track listing 
 "Theme from Bullitt" (Lalo Schifrin) – 3:20
 "All Along the Watchtower" (Bob Dylan) – 3:20
 "Ain't Nothing Like the Real Thing" (Nickolas Ashford, Valerie Simpson) – 3:10
 "Hi-Heel Sneakers" (Robert Higginbotham) – 2:50
 "The Split" (Quincy Jones) – 3:35
 "Doing My Thing" (Wayne Henderson) – 4:30
 "Up Here Down Below" (Wayne Henderson) – 3:11
 "Please Return Your Love to Me" (Norman Whitfield, Barrett Strong) – 2:35
 "With a Little Help from My Friends" (John Lennon, Paul McCartney) – 2:20
 "It's Just a Game, Love" (Jones) – 2:40

Personnel 
Wilton Felder – tenor saxophone, arranger
Wayne Henderson – trombone, arranger
Other unidentified musicians

References 

Wilton Felder albums
1969 albums
Pacific Jazz Records albums